German submarine U-228 was a Type VIIC U-boat built for Nazi Germany's Kriegsmarine for service during World War II.

Built at the Friedrich Krupp Germaniawerft shipyard in Kiel, the U-boat was laid down on 18 October 1941, launched on 30 July 1942 and commissioned on 12 September 1942. U-228 served with the 5th U-boat Flotilla for training, and later with the 6th U-boat Flotilla from 1 March 1943 to 5 October 1944 as a front-line boat. U-228 completed six patrols without sinking any ships, but shot down two aircraft. She was damaged at Bergen, Norway, struck on 5 October 1944 and later broken up.

Design
German Type VIIC submarines were preceded by the shorter Type VIIB submarines. U-228 had a displacement of  when at the surface and  while submerged. She had two shafts and two  propellers.

U-228 was fitted with five  torpedo tubes (four fitted at the bow and one at the stern), fourteen torpedoes, one  SK C/35 naval gun, 220 rounds, and an anti-aircraft gun. The boat had a complement of between forty-four and sixty.

References

Bibliography

External links

German Type VIIC submarines
U-boats commissioned in 1942
World War II submarines of Germany
1942 ships
Ships built in Kiel
Maritime incidents in October 1944